Nawell Azzouz, better known as Wallen (born January 23, 1978) is a French R&B singer. Her stage name comes from the rearrangement of the letters of her first name.

She was born in Saint-Denis, France, to Moroccan parents from Berkane. As a child, she learned to play the violin and developed a passion for singing. She grew up listening to funk, hip hop, and R&B.

Influenced by Aaliyah, Wallen made her recording debut with producer Sullee B Wax, and rapper Sté Strass. In 1998, she was featured on the French RnB compilation "24 Carats", with "Je ne pleurs pas" (I'm not crying).

Her first hit came with "Celle Qui Dit Non" with the rapper Shurik'n. In 2004, she released the album Avoir La Vie Devant Soi which includes the singles "Bouge Cette Vie", "L'Olivier", and "Donna"'. She also sang with Usher on the French version of "U Got It Bad".

With Abd al Malik and a few other rappers she created a group called Beni Snassen, that recorded an album under that name.

In 2008, she released her 3rd album Misericorde.

Personal life
She is married to the French rapper Abd al Malik. Wallen has one child and has stopped singing to concentrate on raising her child.

Discography

Albums

Singles

Featured in

References

External links
 Official Website of Wallen

1978 births
Living people
French women singers
French women rappers
French rhythm and blues singers
French people of Moroccan descent